The 1999 Worcester City Council election took place on 6 May 1999 to elect members of Worcester City Council in Worcestershire, England. One third of the council was up for election and the Labour Party stayed in overall control of the council.

After the election, the composition of the council was:
Labour 20
Conservative 11
Independent 3
Liberal Democrat 2

Election result
The results saw Labour hold onto their majority on the council after losing one seat to the Conservatives. The Conservative gain in All Saints ward was the first gain in Worcester they had made from Labour in several years. Overall voter turnout in the election was 29.8%.

References

Worcester City Council election
1999
1990s in Worcestershire